Isaac ibn Latif (c. 1210-1280) was a Jewish philosopher, who lived most of his life in Toledo. In 1238 he published
his first work, a treatise named  sha'ar ha-shama'yim ("heaven's gate"), a commentary on Koheles (Ecclesiastes).
 Artscroll's Koheles cites from his work.

Other works
Other works by ibn Latif include
 Iggeret ha-Teshuvah and
 Tsurat ha-Olam (published 1260; printed 1860 in Vienna).

The earliest printing of his Sefer Rov Po'a'lim ספר פעלים, was in 1885.

Family
His father's name was Abraham (אברהם) ; he had a son named Moses (משה).

References

 Shoey Raz: Latif, Isaac b. Abraham ibn. In: Encyclopaedia Judaica, 2. edition, Vol. 12, Detroit 2007, pp. 506–507 (online)
Dan Cohn-Sherbok: Medieval Jewish Philosophy. Routledge 1996, pp. 117–119
Harvey J. Hames: The Art of Conversion: Christianity and Kabbalah in the Thirteenth Century. Brill 2000, pp. 56–57

13th-century Castilian Jews
1210 births
1280 deaths
Spanish philosophers
Medieval Jewish philosophers
People from Toledo, Spain
Neoplatonists